Crossing the Rubicon (Revisited) is the re-recording of the debut album by the Swedish melodic death metal band Armageddon, and released by Listenable Records. This is the first album with the band to feature ex-Nightrage vocalist Antony Hämäläinen.

Track listing
"2022" (Intro)  – 2:01 (instrumental)
"Godforsaken"  – 4:39 
"The Juggernaut Divine"  – 5:15
"Astral Adventure"  – 5:15 
"Funeral in Space"  – 3:09 (instrumental)
"Asteroid Dominion"  – 4:53 
"Galaxies Away Pt.2 (Through The Wormhole)"  – 2:46 (instrumental) 
"Faithless"  – 2:14
"Children of the New Sun"  – 2:45 (instrumental)
"Into the Sun"  – 4:38
"Nothing Is Nothing" – 3:46
"Forbidden Zone" (instrumental Bonus Track) – 3:47

Personnel
 Antony Hämäläinen – vocals
 Christopher Amott – guitar, backing vocals
 Joey Concepcion – guitar
 Andrew Pevny – bass
 Márton Veress – drums

References

2016 debut albums
Armageddon (Swedish band) albums